Low Winter Sun is a two-part miniseries that first aired on Channel 4 in Great Britain, in 2006. It was aired in the United States by BBC America. The series, written by Simon Donald, stars Mark Strong as Detective Sergeant Frank Agnew, a police officer who murders a fellow officer and believes he has committed the perfect crime. The miniseries was adapted into a 10-episode series by AMC, with Strong reprising his role as Detective Agnew.

Awards and nominations

References

External links

2006 British television series debuts
2006 British television series endings
2000s British drama television series
English-language television shows
2000s British television miniseries
Channel 4 television dramas
Television series by Endemol
Films shot in Edinburgh
Television series by Tiger Aspect Productions
British detective television series